Cancellaphera is a genus of sea snails, marine gastropod mollusks in the family Cancellariidae, the nutmeg snails.

Species
Species within the genus Cancellaphera include:

 Cancellaphera amasia Iredale, 1930

References

Cancellariidae
Monotypic gastropod genera